Wolf Cub may refer to: 
 the young of the wolf
 an original name for a Cub in a program associated with Scouting
 Wolf Cub (comics), Wolf Cub (Nicholas Gleason) is a fictional character in the Marvel Universe